This is a list of diplomatic missions of Jordan.

Africa

Americas

Asia

Europe

Oceania

Multilateral organisations

Gallery

Non-resident representations (still unconfirmed/unverified)

See also 
 Foreign relations of Jordan
 List of diplomatic missions in Jordan
 Visa policy of Jordan

Notes

References

Citations

External links
 Foreign Ministry of the Hashemite Kingdom of Jordan

 
Jordan
Diplomatic missions